Jenny Maria Alversjö, (born 5 February 1974) is a Swedish television presenter for TV4. She has also presented the morning show Nyhetsmorgon at TV4. She also presented the show På bar gärning at Sjuan. Since 2014, she has presented the show Kalla Fakta at TV4. She has also presented Spårlöst. She has competed in the national team in water polo.

References 

1974 births
Living people
Swedish television hosts
Swedish women television presenters
People from Haninge Municipality